Allen May (born October 30, 1969 in Dallas, Texas) is an American racecar driver. He drove in the U.S. F2000 National Championship, and, in 1997 he started a single race in the  Indy Racing League IndyCar Series for Arizona Motorsport at Texas Motor Speedway where he crashed on lap 36 and was credited with 22nd place.  He is also a former Formula Continental SCCA national champion.

Racing record

SCCA National Championship Runoffs

American Open-Wheel racing results
(key) (Races in bold indicate pole position, races in italics indicate fastest race lap)

American Continental Championship results

USAC FF2000 National Championship results

USF2000 National Championship results

IRL IndyCar Series

References

External links

Allen May statistics at ChampCarStats.com

1969 births
Living people
IndyCar Series drivers
Racing drivers from Dallas
SCCA National Championship Runoffs winners
U.S. F2000 National Championship drivers